Mugum Karmarong is a rural municipality located in Mugu District of Karnali Province of Nepal.
The rural municipality spans  of area, with a total population of 5,393 according to a 2011 Nepal census. Mugum Karmarong is the second largest rural municipality of Nepal.

On March 10, 2017, the Government of Nepal restructured the local level bodies into 753 new local level structures.

The previous Dolphu, Mugu, Kimari, Pulu and Mangri VDCs were merged to form Mugum Karmarong Rural Municipality.
Mugum Karmarong is divided into 9 wards, with Pulu declared the administrative center of the rural municipality.

Demographics
At the time of the 2011 Nepal census, Mugum Karmarong Rural Municipality had a population of 5,423. Of these, 67.4% spoke Tamang, 24.9% Nepali, 7.3% Sherpa and 0.4% other languages as their first language.

In terms of ethnicity/caste, 74.9% were Tamang, 16.9% Chhetri, 7.0% Kami, 0.4% other Dalit, 0.2% other Terai and 0.6% others.

In terms of religion, 74.6% were Buddhist and 25.4% Hindu.

References

External links
 Official website

Populated places in Mugu District
Rural municipalities in Karnali Province
Rural municipalities of Nepal established in 2017